Bank Audi (Arabic: بنك عودة, previously Bank Audi-Saradar) is a Lebanon-based universal bank and financial services company headquartered in Beirut, offering financial products and services in personal banking, business banking, private banking and Treasury and Capital Markets segments.

Bank Audi has a network of 116 branches and more than 300 ATMs, and worldwide correspondents in 25 cities globally. It operates principally in Lebanon, in the MENA region and in Turkey. As of September 2021, Bank Audi's private customers’ deposits reached USD 20.8 billion, with shareholders’ equity reaching US$2.7 billion, and consolidated assets totaling US$28.0 billion.

History
Bank Audi was founded in 1830, but was only incorporated as a bank in 1962.

Members of the Audi family, as well as Kuwaiti investors, were the first shareholders. Since 1983, the shareholder base has expanded and currently consists of more than 1,500 holders of Common Shares and Global Depository Receipts.

In 2004, Bank Audi signed a merger agreement with Banque Saradar, entitling Saradar Holding to become one of the largest shareholders of Bank Audi sal-Audi Saradar Group. After six years of managing the Audi Saradar Group Private Banking, both banks de-merged, and Bank Audi continued privately on its own.

On 20 February 2019, Bank Audi announced a new deposit agreement by which The Bank of New York Mellon is named the successor depositary bank for its global depositary receipt programme, replacing Deutsche Bank Trust Company Americas as Depositary.

Following the 17 October Revolution, the bank was declared bankrupt.

Operations

Board of directors
 Mr. Samir N. Hanna, chairman of the Board – General Manager and Group Chief Executive Officer
 Dr. Marwan M. Ghandour, Vice-chairman of the Board
 Mr. Marc J. Audi, Vice-chairman of the Board - General Manager
 Sheikha Mariam N. Al Sabbah
 Dr. Imad I. Itani
 Mr. Abdullah I. Al Hubayb
 Dr. Khalil M. Bitar
 Mrs. Sherine R. Audi, General Manager and board member of Bank Audi France
 Mr. Farid F. Lahoud, Assistant General Manager - Group Corporate Secretary

Banking services

Retail and personal banking
Personal banking at Bank Audi consists of the services and products offered to the individuals.

Commercial and corporate banking
Business Banking at Bank Audi is the set of services offered to businesses and corporations in Lebanon. It includes corporate banking, commercial banking, and SME banking.

Private banking
Bank Audi Private Bank began its operations in 1976 and has been handling it through two main booking centers based in Switzerland and United Arab Emirates.

Major shareholders
FRH Investment Holding sal holds the greatest shares, followed by Audi family, heirs of Sheikha Suad Hamad Al Saleh Al Homaizi, Sheikh Dhiab Bin Zayed Al Nehayan, Al Sabbah family, and others.

Main subsidiaries
Bank Audi sal subsidiaries include Odea Bank – Turkey, Banque Audi – Switzerland, Audi Private Bank sal, Audi Capital – Kingdom of Saudi Arabia, Bank Audi – Qatar, Bank Audi France sa, SOLIFAC and Audi Investments Holding.

Innovative services
In 2011, Bank Audi introduced NOVO spaces in selected locations to allow live video chat with tellers and to provide an advisory room for expert consultancies.

Bank Audi introduced Interactive Teller Machines by the NCR Corporation in 2014. Their concept revolve around allowing customers to talk live to a personal teller for transfers, deposits, cashing cheques and making different types of payments.

In 2014, Bank Audi introduced Tap2Pay, the first near-field communication mobile payment service in Lebanon and the Middle East.

Culture

Audi foundation
Founded in 2000 by Raymond Audi, the Audi Foundation aims at preserving the culture, heritage and craftsmanship of Sidon, Lebanon.

In 2018, World Music Day was celebrated by the Audi Foundation with two concerts, and the Swiss World Cup matches were transmitted on the terraces, in an event organized by the Embassy of Switzerland in Lebanon.

Corporate art collection

Bank Audi created a comprehensive corporate art collection, located in three of the bank's buildings. The villa, or historical headquarters situated steps from the Rue Sursock in the Achrafieh neighborhood of Beirut shelters mosaics and other pieces from Antiquity. The current headquarters, designed by Kevin Dash in Beirut Central District, houses modern and contemporary art from Europe (Raoul Dufy, Édouard Vuillard, Bernard Buffet, Jacques Villon, Paul Delvaux and Tour Dentelièrea large sculpture by Jean Dubuffet in the atrium) and Lebanon (Shafic Abboud, Hanibal Srouji, Lamia Joreige, Chaouki Chamoun, Jean-Marc Nahas, Paul Wakim, Mohammad Rawas, Hussein Madi). The Geneva headquarters has an ensemble of Old Master paintings (Lucas Cranach the Elder, Pieter Brueghel the Younger, Abel Grimmer, Frans Snyders, Jan van Goyen, Jacob van Ruisdael).

Corporate social responsibility
Bank Audi started its corporate social responsibility initiatives in 2012. Its CSR policy currently contributes to five pillars: corporate governance, economic development, community development, human development and environmental protection. In 2017, Bank Audi worked mainly on highlighting the SME business line as empowerment to the Lebanon's economic infrastructure, launching the “Let’s Talk Money” quiz, enhancing accessibility to ATM's and branches for the physically disabled, taking part in the Lebanon Climate Act – Climate Change Champion, pledging Goal Leader to SDG 8 – Decent Work and Economic Growth – at UN GCNL and engaging millennials in the Corporate Volunteer Program through the “Spring” account.

Sponsorship
Bank Audi sponsored the More Than Money program by Injaz Lebanon that aims at educating children in school about earning, spending, tracking, and investing cash. The program was delivered to 400 students in six public schools across Lebanon, and consisted of 12 classes given as part of Global money Week activities that extended from 12 to 18 March 2018. Employees from Bank Audi volunteered to give those classes.

Bank Audi also partnered with Beirut Traders Association and collaborated with the MIT Enterprise Forum – Pan Arab Region, to sponsor Grow My Business, which is an entrepreneurship competition that awards three startups for their business idea. The competition was held 6 times, the last of which being in 2017.

Bank Audi launched Beyond Banking Hackathon to nurture Lebanon's fintech and banking sectors by creating an environment for participants to test their ideas prior to launching.

See also 

 List of Banks in Lebanon
 BLOM Bank
 Bankmed
Saradar Bank
 Byblos Bank
 Fransabank
 Economy of Lebanon
Banque du Liban
MEAB bank

References

1830 establishments in the Ottoman Empire
Banks established in 1830
Banks of Lebanon
Companies based in Beirut
Lebanese brands
Companies listed on the Beirut Stock Exchange